My Childish Father (French: Mon gosse de père) is a 1953 French drama film directed by Léon Mathot and starring Maurice Teynac, Jean Tissier and Arlette Poirier. It is based on the 1925 play of the same title by Léopold Marchand which had previously been made into a 1930 film My Childish Father. The film's sets were designed by the art director Raymond Druart.

Synopsis
A party-minded Parisian architect attempts to try and settle down when he marries a younger wife. However he still finds it impossible to overcome his distaste for hard work and his love of fun. Not even the arrival of his hard-working illegitimate American son can change him/

Cast
 Maurice Teynac as 	Lucien Landier
 Sirena Adgemova as 	Yvonne Calabrier 
 Jean Tissier as 	Stanley Percheron
 Armand Bernard as Révérend James Holiday
 Jacques François as 	Gérard Morrison
 Arlette Poirier as Philippine Opposum
 Evelyn Nattier	
 Robert Seller	
 Mary Thierry		
 Pamela Wilde

References

Bibliography
 Goble, Alan. The Complete Index to Literary Sources in Film. Walter de Gruyter, 1999.
 Oscherwitz, Dayna & Higgins, MaryEllen. The A to Z of French Cinema. Scarecrow Press, 2009.

External links 
 

1953 films
1950s French-language films
1953 drama films
French drama films
Films directed by Léon Mathot
French films based on plays
Films set in Paris
Remakes of French films
1950s French films